These are the Billboard number-one pop albums of 1971.

Chart history

See also
1971 in music
List of number-one albums (United States)

References

1971
United States Albums